The band Commodore 64 (named after the 1980s computer of the same name) was one of the pioneers of the hip hop music subgenre known as geeksta rap or nerdcore. Formed by four members of a math club and breakdancing troupe in 1992 at a concert in New Jersey, Commodore 64 was the first group to release a single produced entirely using an Apple Macintosh computer, "Horton Hears A Ho" in 1999.

Three of the four members of Commodore 64, Smart Money "Bass-I.Q." Teddy Ruxpin, HMO and The Professa MC Squared are well-respected as intellectuals in their jobs, as a mathematics professor, an economics writer and a deconstructionist philosopher respectively. DJ Goodbeats, the "fourth member", is a computer. 

Commodore 64 released one album, K-Minus Initiative, in December 1999. As the first full-length nerdcore/geeksta rap record to be commercially released, it sold over 130,000 copies in its first three months of release. Their sound and beats have been likened to that of the early Beastie Boys.

They're currently on their self-released, DIY, independently based label, Phantium Records. They're currently not signed to any major label.

Albums
K-Minus Initiative (1999)

References
 IUMA page
 "Mac-Recorded Rap Band Releases MP3" (article in The Mac Observer)

Nerdcore artists
American hip hop groups